Bukit Berapit Rail Tunnel is the longest rail tunnel in Malaysia. It is located in Bukit Berapit near Bukit Gantang in Larut, Matang and Selama District, Perak, Malaysia. It was made as a part of Ipoh-Padang Besar Electrified Double Tracking Project.

History
The tunnel was constructed as an alternative to the old winding tracks with many tunnels. The completion of this tunnel saw the Bukit Berapit Halt closure.

Construction of the tunnel was started in 2008 and was completed in 2013. And now, it has been commissioned and is in operation.

Bukit Berapit has a popular waterfall in Taiping a long time ago.

This twin tunnel, at 3300m, is the longest in South East Asia.

References 

Railway tunnels in Malaysia
Tunnels completed in 1905
1905 establishments in British Malaya